The following is a timeline of the history of the city of Gaborone, Botswana.

Prior to 20th century

 1890 - Gaberones founded by British South Africa Company.
 1897 - Railway station built.

20th century                            

 1960-1966 - Gaberones becomes capital of independent Botswana
 1963 - Town construction begins.
 1964
 Bechuanaland Daily News begins publication.
 Population: 3,855.
 1965
 British colonial Bechuanaland Protectorate capital relocated to Gaberones from Mafeking.
 Gaborone Secondary School built.
 1966
 Gaberones becomes capital of independent Botswana.
 Botswana National Stadium opens.
 Derek Jones becomes mayor.
 1968 - Botswana National Museum built.
 1969
 Gaberones renamed "Gaborone."
 Debswana Diamond Company Ltd headquartered in Gaborone.
 1971 - Population: 17,718.
 1975 - Sister city relationship established with Burbank, California.
 1979 - Serara Ketlogetswe becomes mayor.
 1980
 Mosque built.
 Southern African Development Community headquartered in Gaborone.
 1982
 University of Botswana established.
 University of Botswana Stadium opens.
 1984
 14 June: Raid on Gaborone.
 Seretse Khama International Airport opens.
 Paul Mmlotsi Rantao becomes mayor.
 Mmegi newspaper begins publication.
 1985 - Botswana Gazette newspaper begins publication.
 1988 - Gaborone Broadcasting Company" established.
 1991
 Population: 133,468.
 Botswana College of Agriculture established near city.
 1993 - "The Voice Newspaper" begins publication
 1995 - Botswana Stock Exchange and Botswana Institute for Development Policy Analysis headquartered in city.
 1998 - Fictional The No. 1 Ladies' Detective Agency book series begins publication.
 1999 - Nelson Ramaotwana becomes mayor.

21st century

 2001 - Population: 186,007.
 2002 - Reteng founded.
 2003 - Uniao Flamengo Santos Football Club formed.
 2004 - Harry Mothei becomes mayor.
 2005 - The Voice Newspaper becomes Botswana's best selling newspaper and goes digital.
 2005 - Population: 208,000.
 2007 - National Botanical Garden opens.
 2009
 Steinmetz Gaborone Marathon begins.
 Veronica Lesole becomes mayor.
 2011
 May: 2011 African Junior Athletics Championships held.
 Haskins Nkaigwa becomes mayor.
 2013 - De Beers rough diamond sales headquarters relocated to Gaborone from London.
 2014 - May: 2014 African Youth Games held in Gaborone.
 2017 - Population: 264,311 (estimate).
 2019 - Thata Father Maphongo becomes mayor.

See also
 History of Gaborone
 List of mayors of Gaborone

ReferencesThis article incorporates information from the Italian Wikipedia and Spanish Wikipedia''.

Bibliography

 
 
  (+ 3rd ed. fulltext via Internet Archive)

External links

  (Bibliography of open access  articles)
  (Images, etc.)
  (Images, etc.)
  (Bibliography)
  (Bibliography)
  (Bibliography)
 

 
Gaborone
Gaborone
Years in Botswana
Gaborone